Mettupalayam is a municipality town and taluk headquarters of the Coimbatore district in the Indian state of Tamil Nadu. It is the third largest town in the Coimbatore district after Coimbatore and Pollachi. It's located to the North of the Coimbatore city on the way to Ooty in the foothills of Nilgiri hills. As of 2011, the town had a population of 66,595. Mettupalayam railway station is the starting point of Nilgiri Mountain Railway and it operates the only rack railway in India connecting Ooty and Mettupalayam.

Geography
It has an average elevation of 314 metres (1033 feet). Mettupalayam is situated on the bank of Bhavani River at the foot of the Nilgiri mountains.

Demographics

According to 2011 census, Mettupalayam had a population of 69,213 with a sex-ratio of 1,022 females for every 1,000 males, much above the national average of 929. A total of 6,808 were under the age of six, constituting 3,543 males and 3,265 females. Scheduled Castes and Scheduled Tribes accounted for 14.76% and 0.08% of the population respectively. The average literacy of the town was 77.11%, compared to the national average of 72.99%. The town had a total of 18,423 households. There were a total of 26,595 workers, comprising 147 cultivators, 437 main agricultural labourers, 704 in house hold industries, 23,870 other workers, 1,437 marginal workers, 8 marginal cultivators, 60 marginal agricultural labourers, 92 marginal workers in household industries and 1,277 other marginal workers.

As per the religious census of 2011, Mettupalayam had 69.24% Hindus, 25.65% Muslims, 4.84% Christians, 0.02% Sikhs, 0.15% Jains, 0.04% following other religions and 0.05% following no religion or did not indicate any religious preference.

Politics
Mettupalayam (State Assembly Constituency) is part of Coimbatore (Lok Sabha constituency).

Transport

The Nilgiri Mountain Railway which connects Mettupalayam railway station with Udagamandalam (Ooty) is a UNESCO World Heritage Site. Nilgiri Express connects Mettupalayam to capital Chennai via Coimbatore. Mettupalayam is situated at the base of Nilgiri Hills and hence is the starting point for the Ghat Roads. MEMU express special trains are operated between Coimbatore junction and Mettupalayam daily. Coimbatore is 35 km by road from Mettupalayam and the nearest airport is Coimbatore International Airport. There is proposal for a bypass road from Sulur Kangeyampalayam via neelambur for Mettupalayam via odanthurai to Ooty.

National Highway 181 (India) connecting  Gundlupete in Karnataka state to Nagapattinam passes through Mettupalyam. State highway SH15 from Erode to Ooty  passes through Chittode, Gobichettipalayam, Satyamangalam, Sirumugai, Mettupalayam and Kothagiri. State highway SH80  connects Mettupalayam to Avinashi via Annur.

Places of interest
 Black Thunder Water Theme Park
 Karamadai Ranganadar temple

 Forest College and Research Institute, Kotagiri Road, Mettupalayam
 Idugampalayam Aanjineyar temple
 Kallaar Park at Ooty Road, Mettupalayam
 Kumaran Kundru Murugan temple
 Kurunthamalai Murugan Hill Temple
 Thekkampatti Elephant Camp
 Then Tirupathi Temple
 Vana Bathrakali Amman temple

Nearby villages 
 Marudur

 Athimathaiyanur
 Dhayanur
 Dimmampalayam
 Jadayampalayam 
 Lingapuram
 Nellithurai
 Odandurai
 Paapanur
 Palapatti
 Thekkampatti
 Tholampalayam
 Velliyangadu

See also
 Mountain Train in Ooty

References

Cities and towns in Coimbatore district